A complement receptor is a membrane-bound receptor belonging to the complement system, which is part of the innate immune system. Complement receptors bind effector protein fragments that are produced in response to antigen-antibody complexes or damage-associated molecules. Complement receptor activation contributes to the regulation of inflammation, leukocyte extravasation, and phagocytosis; it also contributes to the adaptive immune response. Different complement receptors can participate in either the classical complement pathway, the alternative complement pathway, or both.

Expression and function 
White blood cells, particularly monocytes and macrophages, express complement receptors on their surface. All four complement receptors can bind to fragments of complement component 3 or complement component 4 coated on pathogen surface, but the receptors trigger different downstream activities. Complement receptor (CR) 1, 3, and 4 function as opsonins which stimulate phagocytosis, whereas CR2 is expressed only on B cells as a co-receptor.

Red blood cells (RBCs) also express CR1, which enables RBCs to carry complement-bound antigen-antibody complexes to the liver and spleen for degradation.

a.B: B cell. E: erythrocyte. Endo: endothelial cell. D: dendritic cell. FDC: follicular dendritic cell. Mac: macrophage. MC: mast cell. M0: monocyte. Pha: phagocyte. PMN: polymorphonuclear leukocyte.

Clinical significance

Deficits in complement receptor expression can cause disease. Mutations in complement receptors which alter receptor function can also increase risk of certain diseases.

See also 
 Complement system
 Humoral immunity
 Immune system

References

External links 
 

Complement system
Single-pass transmembrane proteins